It is common experience that the social evil of eve- teasing is often ignored in our society. The orthodox views about gender relations, poor institutional support to victims and lack of self confidence amongst women are some of the key reasons as to why eve-teasing continues to haunt women in public as well as private spaces.

Eve teasing, when left unchecked, emboldens criminality in the society and leads to creating greater sense of impunity amongst perpetrators. Many a times, such mind set translates into crimes against women in worse form such as street crimes, domestic violence and other forms of gender based violence.
There is also awareness of the fact that women hesitate to approach, pre-dominantly male police force, especially about sensitive matter such as eve teasing. Girls also don’t come forward to report such matters as they are reluctant to make their identity public and face either social or familial condemnation or due to fear of retribution.

The UP Police established a 24@7 Contact Center in Lucknow, called the WPL 1090 with the aim to provide opportunity to girls in UP to freely register complaints of eve-teasing and set up an innovative ICT based application to process and redress their complaints.

The complaints could broadly be classified into following four categories:

Eve-teasing through phone
Eve-teasing through social media, like facebook, etc.
Stalking
Hotspots of eve-teasing closer to places where girls normally go to such as market places, colleges etc.

The Contact Centre is located in the heart of Lucknow and is manned by women as well as men police force.

External links 
 Official website of Women Power Line 1090

Education in Uttar Pradesh
Bullying
Students in India
Abuse
Youth rights
Ragging